Prince Jean of Luxembourg (given names: Jean Félix Marie Guillaume; born 15 May 1957), the second son of Jean, Grand Duke of Luxembourg and Princess Joséphine-Charlotte of Belgium. He is the twin brother of Princess Margaretha. He frequently goes by the name of Jean Nassau.

On 26 September 1986, Prince Jean renounced his right of succession to the Luxembourg throne.

Education and youth

Prince Jean's godparents were Prince Felix of Luxembourg and Princess Margrethe of Denmark.

Prince Jean was educated in Luxembourg, Switzerland and France, where he obtained his baccalaureate. He then undertook a language course at the Bell School of Languages in Cambridge England.

In 1977, Prince Jean began his military officer training at the Royal Military Academy Sandhurst, England and member of the Champion Platoon, having been commissioned in August 1978. He was made a captain of the Luxembourg Army in 1979. After completing his university education in Geneva, he went to New York and joined W.R. Grace as a financial analyst working in the Finance, Planning & Analysis Division of the Group that reported to the President & CEO of the company - at the time, Mr J. Peter Grace.  Back in Europe in 1985, in 1986 he obtained an MBA from INSEAD in Fontainebleau, France.

Career
Prince Jean works in the water industry as an advisor to the GDF-Suez Group, Executive VP of the Suez Fondation and a member of the executive board of Degrémont, a subsidiary of Suez Environnement. Prince Jean has been President of the Chambre de Commerce belgo-luxembourgeoise en France. In 2006 he bought the Southern African Water subsidiary of Suez Environnement, WSSA (Water & Sanitation South Africa) and created Mea Aqua, with the objective of developing water and energy solutions in the Middle East and in Africa. Mea Aqua and its subsidiaries employ today over 2,500 employees.

Prince Jean is a member of the board of the MIP, a business school based in Paris and a board member of a number of financial institutions: Banque Degroof Luxembourg, EFG Bank and EFG International, Ecofin (hedge funds in the utilities sector).

Marriage and family
On 27 May 1987, Prince Jean married morganatically in Paris, France, Hélène Suzanna Vestur (b. 31 May 1958, Saint-Germain-en-Laye, France), now a high civil servant, Conseiller d'Etat and judge, daughter of François Philippe Vestur (b. 1927), merchant, and his wife Cécile Ernestine Buisson (b. 1928). His wife and children bore the title "Count(ess) of Nassau" from 21 September 1995. On 27 November 2004 Grand-Duc Henri issued an Arrêté Grand-Ducal upgrading the titles of Prince Jean's children to Prince/Princesse de Nassau with the qualification of Altesse Royale, without succession rights. The prince and former countess divorced on 13 December 2004, having four children together:

 Princess Marie-Gabrielle Cecile Charlotte Sophia of Nassau (b. 8 September 1986, Paris, France). She married Antonius Benedict Clemens Douglas Emanuel Willms (b. 22 December 1988, Atlanta, Georgia, United States; son of Hayo Willms, CEO of the German division of Rothschild Private Banking & Trust, and his wife Countess Maria Theresia von Goëss) in a civil ceremony on 15 May 2017 in Luxembourg. The religious ceremony took place on 2 September 2017 at the Ermita del Santo Cristo Church in Marbella, Spain. They have two sons:
 Zeno Philippe Leopold Marcus d'Aviano Willms (b. 5 June 2018, Munich, Austria).
 Cajetan Jean Wenceslas Marcus d'Aviano Willms (b. 2 September 2020, Vienna, Austria).
 Prince Constantin Jean Philippe Marie Albert Marc d'Aviano de Nassau (b. 22 July 1988, Paris, France). He married Kathryn "Katy" Sheena Mechie (b. 1989, London, England) on 22 December 2020 in Gibraltar. They have two children: 
 Prince Félix of Nassau (b. 22 April 2018).
 Princess Cosima of Nassau (b. 13 May 2022).
Prince Wenceslas François Baudoin Léopold Juraj Marie Marc d'Aviano de Nassau (b. 17 November 1990, Paris, France).
 Prince Carl-Johan Félix Julien Marc d'Aviano de Nassau (b. 15 August 1992, Paris, France). He married Ivanna Jamin (b. 1994) on 2019. They have one child: 
 Prince Xander of Nassau (b. 2021).

On 18 March 2009, Prince Jean married Diane de Guerre (b. 13 July 1962, Düsseldorf, Germany) in a civil ceremony in Roermond, Netherlands. She is a daughter of French General Claude Gaston de Guerre (1910–1997) and German Countess Eugenie Wolff-Metternich zur Gracht (1923–2016), and based on the grand ducal house law was granted the title of "Comtesse de Nassau" (Countess Diane of Nassau).

Honours and awards

National honours
 : Knight of the Order of the Gold Lion of the House of Nassau
 : Knight Grand Cross of the Order of Adolphe of Nassau

Foreign honours
  : Knight Grand Cross of the Order of Isabella the Catholic (8 July 1980)

References

External links

Official website of the Grand Ducal family

1957 births
Living people
Luxembourgian princes
Luxembourgian twins
People from Betzdorf, Luxembourg
House of Nassau-Weilburg
Princes of Bourbon-Parma
INSEAD alumni
Graduates of the Royal Military Academy Sandhurst
Knights Grand Cross of the Order of Isabella the Catholic
Sons of monarchs